Dear Affy is a 2020 Nigerian romantic comedy film written and directed by Samuel Olatunji. The film stars Toyin Abraham, Enyinna Nwigwe, Kehinde Bankole and Odunlade Adekola in the lead roles. Newcomer Bianca Udo made her film acting debut through this film. The film had its theatrical release on 14 February 2020 coinciding Valentine's Day and received mixed reviews from critics.

Cast 

 Toyin Abraham
 Enyinna Nwigwe
 Kehinde Bankole
 Odunlade Adekola
 Chinedu Ikedieze
 Bimbo Ademoye
 Hafiz Oyetoro
 Chiwetalu Agu
 Ali Nuhu
 Lizzy Jay
 Antnette Lecky

Synopsis 
An organized ardent female art enthusiast who is about to marry a man of her cherishing dreams then faces sudden obstacles and challenges after becoming pregnant accidentally even before her marriage. This spoiled her well-prepared and laid out plans and strategies and she embarks on a challenging mission in search of the father of the unborn baby.

Awards and nominations

References 

2020 films
Nigerian romantic comedy films
2020 romantic comedy films
English-language Nigerian films
Films shot in Nigeria
2020s English-language films